The cuneiform sign KÁ, for gate is the Sumerogram-(logogram) used in the Amarna letters and the Epic of Gilgamesh; as just KÁ it means "gate" or "doorway", Akkadian language, "bābu"; as "Gate-Great", KÁ.GAL for City-Gate, it is from Akkadian "abullu", ("(city) gate"). Both uses are in the Epic of Gilgamesh. In the Epic, it is only used as the sumerogram, a total of 19 times, (7 times for 'abullu', city gate). In the Epic, all spellings for city gate use KÁ.GAL; for gate ('bābu') only one spelling uses the alphabetic letters for b-a-b-u; the rest use KÁ along with other added cuneiform signs (KÁ-x-x, or KÁ-x, etc.).

Amarna letters
In the Amarna letters, the topic of Amarna letter EA 296, Under the Yoke, is the guarding of two cities, at the city gate; also the man authoring the letter, Yabitiri-(Yahtiru)-(governor?) of City? is called a "gatekeeper", lines 24 and 31: LÚ.PA.KÁ.ŠU, Man-Gate-"hand". Šu (cuneiform), (shaped like a 'hand'), has the secondary meaning besides šu, for Akkadian language qat, for "qātu", 'hand' (as ŠU, a sumerogram), and used for 9 of about 15 spellings of 'qātu' in the Epic of Gilgamesh.

In letter EA 296, the text is as follows: (reverse side of letter)

"...inquire of his commissioner whether I guard the city gate of Azzatu, and the city gate of Yapu, ...."

The city gate is also discussed in the Amarna letter from Tjaru.

See also
 Yabitiri
 Tjaru

References

Moran, William L. 1987, 1992. The Amarna Letters. Johns Hopkins University Press, 1987, 1992. 393 pages.(softcover)
 Parpola, 1971. The Standard Babylonian Epic of Gilgamesh, Parpola, Simo, Neo-Assyrian Text Corpus Project, c 1997, Tablet I thru Tablet XII, Index of Names, Sign List, and Glossary-(pp. 119–145), 165 pages.

Cuneiform signs
Sumerograms